Pedro Francisco Esquivel Montoya (born 3 August 1993) is a Mexican professional footballer. He played with Atlético Veracruz of the Liga de Balompié Mexicano during the league's inaugural season, leading them to a runners-up finish after losing to Chapulineros de Oaxaca in the finals.

References

External links
Player profile on Ascenso MX

1993 births
Living people
Mexican footballers
Association football midfielders
Club América footballers
Altamira F.C. players
Toros Neza footballers
Cimarrones de Sonora players
Gavilanes de Matamoros footballers
Liga MX players
Ascenso MX players
Liga Premier de México players
Footballers from Aguascalientes
People from Aguascalientes City
Liga de Balompié Mexicano players